José Antonio 'Toni' Grande Cereijo (born 17 September 1947) is a Spanish retired footballer who played as a central midfielder, and is an assistant manager.

Playing career
Born in Valencia, Grande graduated from Real Madrid's youth academy, going on to play 111 competitive games during his five-year spell with the first team, winning two La Liga championships and one Copa del Rey trophy. He made his league debut on 19 January 1969 in a 2–2 away draw against Córdoba CF (90 minutes played), but only made a combined fourteen appearances in his first two seasons.
 
Additionally, Grande also represented Rayo Vallecano, Racing de Santander, Granada CF and Palencia CF, the first and the last being the only clubs with which he did not play in the top division, where he amassed totals of 176 matches and 31 goals. He retired from professional football at the age of 31.

Internationally, Grande competed for Spain at the 1968 Summer Olympics.

Coaching career
Grande returned to Real Madrid in 1979, managing several youth teams as well as Real Madrid Castilla and Real Madrid C. In the late 90s/early 2000s he worked as first-team assistant under several coaches, mainly Vicente del Bosque, then left the club briefly and returned again, being part of Fabio Capello's coaching staff as the side won the 2007 national championship.

In 2004, Grande re-joined del Bosque during his brief adventure in Turkey with Beşiktaş JK. The pair reunited again four years later, in the same capacity, at the Spain national team. 

On 2 November 2017, Grande was named assistant coach of South Korea under Shin Tae-Yong for their 2018 FIFA World Cup campaign.

Managerial statistics

Honours
Real Madrid
La Liga: 1968–69, 1971–72
Copa del Generalísimo: 1969–70

References

External links

1947 births
Living people
Spanish footballers
Footballers from Valencia (city)
Association football midfielders
La Liga players
Segunda División players
Real Madrid CF players
Rayo Vallecano players
Racing de Santander players
Granada CF footballers
Spain under-23 international footballers
Spain amateur international footballers
Olympic footballers of Spain
Footballers at the 1968 Summer Olympics
Spanish football managers
Segunda División managers
Segunda División B managers
Real Madrid C managers
Real Madrid Castilla managers
Real Madrid CF non-playing staff
Spanish expatriate sportspeople in Turkey
Spanish expatriate sportspeople in South Korea
Palencia CF players